Standard pistol can be used:
As a synonym for sport pistol about a .22-caliber handgun commonly used in shooting sports
About the 25 metre standard pistol event, using such a pistol
For the unrelated Standard Pistol class in PPC 1500 competitions